Vazsonyi or Vázsonyi is a Hungarian surname. It may refer to:
Andrew Vázsonyi (1916–2003), mathematician and operations researcher
Balint Vazsonyi (1936–2003), pianist and journalist
Vilmos Vázsonyi (1868–1926), publicist and politician

Hungarian-language surnames